Ian Clarke is a Canadian retired soccer player who played professionally in the A-League and National Professional Soccer League

In 1996, Clarke, brother of Chris Clarke, signed with the Vancouver 86ers of the A-League.  He played outdoor soccer with them until 1999.  During those years, Clarke also played indoor soccer.  In the fall of 1996, he joined the Edmonton Drillers of the National Professional Soccer League.  In 1998, he returned to the indoor game with the Milwaukee Wave.  He became a regular with the Wave and was named to the 1998–99 NPSL All Rookie Team.  In 1999,  Clarke began the season with the Wave before being traded to the St. Louis Ambush before being sent to the Wichita Wings for the end of the season.  In 2001, he played for the Montreal Impact.  In 2003, Clarke began the season with the Calgary Storm in the USL A-League, but left the team in July to return to Vancouver.

References 

Living people
1975 births
A-League (1995–2004) players
Calgary Storm players
Canadian soccer players
Canadian expatriate soccer players
Edmonton Drillers (1996–2000) players
Milwaukee Wave players
Montreal Impact (1992–2011) players
National Professional Soccer League (1984–2001) players
St. Louis Ambush (1992–2000) players
Vancouver Whitecaps (1986–2010) players
Wichita Wings (NPSL) players
Association football midfielders
Association football forwards
Sportspeople from New Westminster